William John Duane (May 9, 1780 – September 27, 1865) was an American politician and lawyer from Pennsylvania.

Duane served a brief term as United States Secretary of the Treasury in 1833. His refusal to withdraw Federal deposits from the Second Bank of the United States led to his dismissal by President Andrew Jackson.

Early life
Duane was born on May 9, 1780, in Clonmel, County Tipperary, Ireland. Duane emigrated to the United States with his parents, William Duane, and Catherine Corcoran in 1796, settling in Philadelphia. He assisted his father in publishing the Aurora, a pro-Jeffersonian Philadelphia newspaper, until 1806. He became an influential lawyer and served several terms in the Pennsylvania General Assembly, becoming one of the most powerful state politicians in Pennsylvania at the time.

Marriage

He was married on December 31, 1805, in Philadelphia, Pennsylvania, to Deborah Franklin Bache, who was born on October 1, 1781, in Philadelphia, and died on February 12, 1863, in Philadelphia. His father-in-law was Richard Bache Sr., a marine insurance underwriter and importer in Philadelphia. Bache served as United States Postmaster General from 1776 to 1782. His mother-in-law was Sarah Franklin Bache, the daughter of Benjamin Franklin.

Support for Andrew Jackson

Duane supported Jackson for president in 1824 and 1828. He declined appointments to serve as government director of the Second Bank of the United States and United States District Attorney.

Secretary of the Treasury
In 1833, in the midst of the Bank War, President Andrew Jackson attempted to remove federal deposits from the Second Bank of the United States, whose money-lending functions were taken over by the legions of local and state banks that materialized across America, thus drastically increasing credit and speculation. Jackson's moves were greatly controversial. He removed his moderately pro-Bank Treasury Secretary Louis McLane, having him serve instead as Secretary of State, replacing Edward Livingston. On May 29, he replaced McLane with Duane. However, Duane also refused to remove the deposits. As a result, Jackson fired him in September. He replaced him with Attorney General Roger B. Taney, a strong opponent of the Bank. Under Taney, the deposits began to be removed.

Duane defended his own position in his book Narrative and Correspondence Concerning the Removal of the Deposites, and Occurrences Connected Therewith, published in 1838.

Jackson biographer James Parton heaps high praise upon Duane. He lauds the Treasury Secretary for refusing to yield to a position that he could not in good conscience accept, therefore preserving his integrity and honor. "In not yielding," Parton says, "he displayed a genuine moral heroism." Later Jackson biographer Robert V. Remini treats Duane far less favorably. He faults both Jackson and Duane for the turmoil that characterized Duane's brief time in office. He criticizes Jackson for not adequately screening Duane before nominating him, for allowing members of his administration to treat him poorly upon taking office, and for his dismissal of Duane. He continues:

He died on September 27, 1865, in Philadelphia and was interred at Laurel Hill Cemetery.

See also
 List of foreign-born United States Cabinet members

References

Bibliography
  
 
 
 Phillips, Kim T. "William Duane, Philadelphia's Democratic Republicans, and the Origins of Modern Politics." Pennsylvania Magazine of History and Biography (1977): 365–387. online
 *

External links

1780 births
1865 deaths
18th-century Irish people
19th-century American newspaper publishers (people)
19th-century American politicians
19th-century Irish people
Burials at Laurel Hill Cemetery (Philadelphia)
Editors of Pennsylvania newspapers
Franklin family
Irish emigrants to the United States (before 1923)
Jackson administration cabinet members
Members of the Pennsylvania General Assembly
Pennsylvania lawyers
People from Clonmel
Politicians from County Tipperary
Politicians from Philadelphia
United States Secretaries of the Treasury